Galleazzo Appiani was an Italian architect who worked in Poland. Amongst his designs are the Carmelite Church in Przemyśl and the Krasicki Palace, built between 1592 and 1618 for the Krasicki family in Krasiczyn.

Notes 

 Torbus, Tomasz. Poland. Germany: Nelles Verlag, 2001.
Łoziński, Jerzy Z.., Miłobędzki, Adam. Guide to Architecture in Poland. Poland: Polonia Publishing House, 1967.
Rostworowski, Emanuel., Cękalska, Krystyna., Gieysztor, Aleksander., Kieniewicz, Stefan. History of Poland. Poland: PWN, Polish Scientific Publishers, 1979.

16th-century Italian architects
17th-century Italian architects
Przemyśl
Year of death unknown
Year of birth unknown